Ice hockey in Italy is governed by the Federazione Italiana Sport del Ghiaccio. The Serie A was founded in 1925, which was merged with the Inter-National League to become the Alps Hockey League in 2016. The second level Serie B, and the third level Serie C operate below it. Italian men's, women's, man's U-20, man's U-18, and women's U-18 national teams participate at the IIHF World Championships. Italy has been a member of the IIHF since January 24, 1924.

References

External links
Country profile on IIHF.com

 
Inter-National League
Alps Hockey League